Rosa Jamali (born 1977 in Tabriz), is an Iranian poet, translator, literary critic and playwright.

Education and career 
She studied Dramatic Literature at the Tehran University of Art and later received an MA degree in English literature from Tehran University.

Her debut collection of poems, This Dead Body is Not an Apple, It Is Either a Cucumber or a Pear, was published in 1997 and announced a major new voice in Iranian poetry. The book opened Persian poetry to new creative possibilities.

Making Coffee To Run a Crime Story focuses on misogyny and crime against women. 

She has been praised in her recent collections for combining present-day settings with Persian mysticism.

Scholars say that she has perceived a new female style and rhetoric and influenced a generation of female Persian poetry.
She is also a prolific translator and has translated English poetry into Persian.

Works

Poetry
This Dead Body Is Not An Apple, It's Either A Cucumber Or A Pear (1997)
Making A Face (1998)
Making Coffee To Run A Crime Story (2002)
The Hourglass is Fast Asleep (2011)
Highways Blocked (2014)
Here Gravity is Less (2019)

Plays
The Shadow (2007)

Translations
Sailing to Byzantium, Selected poems of William Butler Yeats
Tomorrow and Tomorrow and Tomorrow (a selection), William Shakespeare
Edge, An anthology of English Poetry in Persian (Ted Hughes, Ezra Pound, Sylvia Plath, Hilda Doolittle, Emily Dickinson, Adrienne Rich, Stevie Smith, Allen Ginsberg, T.S. Eliot, Joseph Brodsky, Rupert Brooke, Edith Sitwell, Robert Frost, Louise Gluck, Emma Lazarus, Henry Wadsworth Longfellow, Sudeep Sen, Roger McGough, Walt Whitman and many others...)
Tulips, Ten Female Poets in English (Natasha Trethewey, Solmaz Sharif, Louise Gluck, Emma Lazarus, Sylvia Plath, Hilda Doolittle, Emily Dickinson, Adrienne Rich, Stevie Smith, Edith Sitwell)
The Wild Iris, Selected Poems of Louise Gluck
A Certain Lady, Selected Short stories and Poems, Dorothy Parker
Sand and Time, Selected Poems of Amir Or
The House of The Edrisis, a novel by Ghazaleh Alizadeh

Essays
Revelations in the Wind; theory and analysis (Essays on the Poetics of Persian Poetry)

Footnotes

References
Iran in Writing
Bombay Review; Iranian Edition
Rosa Jamali on Taos Journal of Poetry
The Clock Cell and Other Poems
My Promised Meridian
Poetry International
International Poetry Festival of Kosovo
The Street Before You Leave Tehran
The Mirror of My Heart: A Thousand Years of Persian Poetry by Women, translated by Dick Davis, Published by Penguin Classics

1977 births
Living people
Writers from Tabriz
Iranian dramatists and playwrights
Iranian women poets
Women dramatists and playwrights
21st-century Iranian women writers
21st-century Iranian poets
University of Tehran alumni